Anania lancealis is a species of moth of the family Crambidae, described by the Austrian lepidopterists Michael Denis and Ignaz Schiffermüller in 1775. The moth is found in Asia and Europe.

Subspecies
 Anania lancealis lancealis
 Anania lancealis bergmani
 Anania lancealis honshuensis
 Anania lancealis pryeri
 Anania lancealis sinensis
 Anania lancealis taiwanensis

Description
The wingspan of Anania lancealis can reach 30–34 mm. Its forewings are long and narrow, especially in males. The upperside of the wings is whitish, with brown lines and patches. These moths fly at dusk from May to mid-August depending on the location.

The larvae feed on hemp agrimony (Eupatorium cannabinum), but is also reported on ragwort (Jacobaea vulgaris), wood sage (Teucrium scorodonia), greater water-parsnip (Sium latifolium) and woundworts (Stachys species). They pupate in a silken cocoon in which they also hibernate.

Distribution and habitat
This species can be found in the Palearctic including most of Europe. It prefers woodland and marshy fenland.

References

External links
 Paolo Mazzei, Daniel Morel, Raniero Panfili Moths and Butterflies of Europe and North Africa

Pyraustinae
Moths described in 1811
Moths of Asia
Moths of Europe
Taxa named by Michael Denis
Taxa named by Ignaz Schiffermüller